Kolo (named after a traditional dance from the Balkans) is the seventh studio album by Serbian rock band Van Gogh, released in 2006. The album was recorded in Studio Sky and mastered in Sony Music Studios in New York City.

The track "Kolo (Ludo luda)" features lyrics inspired by a folk poem "Riba i devojka" recorded by Vuk Stefanović Karadžić.

Track listing
All the songs were written by Zvonimir Đukić, except where noted
"Kolo" - 2:45
"Vrteška" (S. Radivojević, Z. Đukić) - 2:57
"Plastelin" - 2:53
"Do kraja sveta" - 4:28
"Dišem" - 4:13
"Spisak razloga" - 3:15
"Deo oko tebe" (S. Radivojević, Z. Đukić) - 3:09
"Suđeno mi je" - 3:40
"Od kad te nema" - 3:22
"Emigrant" - 4:07
"Ljubav je" - 4:05

Personnel
Zvonimir Đukić - vocals, guitar, acoustic guitar, mandolin, accordion
Dejan Ilić - bass guitar, acoustic guitar
Srboljub Radivojević - drums, backing vocals, drum programming

Additional personnel
Alis Dunjica - backing vocals (on "Do kraja sveta")
Ana Rajković - backing vocals (on "Suđeno mi je")
Kristina Savić - backing vocals (on "Suđeno mi je")
Bane Crepajac - guitar (solo on "Emigrant")
Marko Đorđević - trumpet (on "Emigrant")
Vlada Negovanović - producer (tracks: 1, 2 3, 6, 7, 11)
Voja Aralica - producer (tracks: 4, 5, 8. 9 10)
James Cruz - mastering
Boris Gavrilovć - recorded by

References

External links
Kolo at Discogs

Van Gogh (band) albums
2006 albums
Folk rock albums by Serbian artists
PGP-RTS albums